Leiosyrinx is a genus of sea snails, marine gastropod mollusks in the family Raphitomidae.

Species
Species within the genus Leiosyrinx include:
 Leiosyrinx apheles Bouchet & Sysoev, 2001
 Leiosyrinx immedicata Bouchet & Sysoev, 2001
 Leiosyrinx liphaima Bouchet & Sysoev, 2001
 Leiosyrinx matsukumai Bouchet & Sysoev, 2001

References

 Bouchet, P. & Sysoev, A., 2001. Typhlosyrinx-like tropical deep-water turriform gastropods (Mollusca, Gastropoda, Conoidea). Journal of Natural History 35: 1693-1715

External links
 Bouchet, P.; Kantor, Y. I.; Sysoev, A.; Puillandre, N. (2011). A new operational classification of the Conoidea (Gastropoda). Journal of Molluscan Studies. 77(3): 273-308.

 
Raphitomidae